A pin insulator is a device that isolates a wire from a physical support such as a pin (a wooden or metal dowel of about 3 cm diameter with screw threads) on a telegraph or utility pole. It is a formed, single layer shape that is made out of a non-conducting material, usually porcelain or glass. It is thought to be the earliest developed overhead insulator and is still popularly used in power networks up to 33 KV. Single or multiple pin insulators can be used on one physical support, however, the number of insulators used depends upon the application's voltage.

Pin insulators are one of three types of overhead insulators, the others being strain insulators and suspension insulators. Unlike the others, pin insulators are directly connected to the physical support compared to being suspended from the wire. Pin insulators are shaped to allow the secure attachment of the conducting wire and avoid it coming adrift. The wire is usually attached to the insulator by being wrapped around it or in other circumstances, fixed into grooves on the insulator itself.

When an insulator is wet, its outer surface becomes conductive making the insulator less effective. An insulator has an umbrella-like design so that it can protect the lower part of the insulator from rain. To keep the inner side of the insulator dry, ridges around the insulator, "rain sheds", are made. These increase the creepage distance from the energized wire to the mounting pin.

Collecting 
Pin insulators have become collectible items. All glass pin insulators are assigned a Consolidated Design (CD) number, a system first implemented by hobbyist N.R. Woodward in 1954, and widely introduced starting in 1965 by collector Helmer Turner. CD numbers first appeared in print in Woodward’s “Glass insulators in America, 1967 report”. Each CD number corresponds to a specific glass style, shape, or manufacturer. CD numbers are only hobby-specific for collectors, and are not used or recognised by insulator manufacturers. 

Insulators, at the time of manufacturing, were simply viewed as an engineering product and were not meant to be an entertainment product for spectators. This meant that the quality of the insulators was not a primary concern of the manufacturers that made them. The finished product was usually discoloured from impurities and foreign objects diffused within the molten glass and metal molds. These impurities give the insulator a unique character and high value as collectors would rather obtain an imperfect product rather than a perfect, common product. Impurities in the glass can create amber swirls, milk swirls, graphite inclusions, and two or three-tone insulators. Foreign objects contained within the glass are known to be nails, pennies, and screws.

Although glass insulators are the most popular for the majority of collectors, many people collect porcelain insulators as well. These also come in a variety of shapes, sizes, and colors. They are classified in the U and M systems, primarily developed by Elton Gish.

Manufacturers 

One of the major U.S. manufacturers that produced glass insulators during the 19th century and early 20th century in the USA was Brookfield Glass Company. It can be assumed that Brookfield may have had poor quality control as their insulators seem to be found with the most imperfections, however, this could be disputed.

Another major U.S. manufacturer that produced glass insulators was the Hemingray Glass Company. They were known for producing the most variety of colors. Some examples of colors that the company produced are yellow, golden yellow, butterscotch, glowing orange, amber, whiskey amber, "root beer" amber, orange-amber, red-amber, oxblood, green, lime green, sage green, depression green, emerald green, olive green, yellow-olive green, aqua, cornflower blue, electric blue, cobalt blue, sapphire blue, glowing peacock blue, and many others. Different colors were produced to allow two or more different utility companies to quickly identify which wires were theirs by the color of insulator if multiple wires were strung over the same utility pole. For example, one company may have a string of amber insulators, while another, on the same poles, might have their insulators in cobalt blue.

There are many manufacturers in the United States, Canada, and other countries that can be found embossed on all styles of insulators. A non-comprehensive list of these manufacturers is below:

United States 
 AT&T
 American Insulator Company
 Armstrong
 Brookfield Glass Company
 Beaver Falls Glass Company
 Baltimore glass manufacturing company
 Barclay
 Birmingham
 Boston bottle works
 Buzby
 California
 California Electric Works
 Chambers
 Chester
 Chicago Insulating Company
 Duquesne
 Electrical Construction and Maintenance Company
 Emminger’s
 Gayner
 Greeley
 Gregory
 Good
 Hawley
 Homer Brooks
 Hamilton
 Hemingray Glass Company
 King City Glass Works (K.C.G.W.)
 Kerr
 Knowles
 Kimble
 Luther G. Tillotson & Company
 Lefferts
 Locke
 Lynchburg
 McLaughlin
 Maydwell
 McKee & Co.
 McMicking
 Mulford & Biddle
 New England Glass Manufacturing Company (N.E.G.M.Co.)
 National Insulator Company 
 Oakman Manufacturing Company
 Ohio Valley Glass Company (O.V.G.Co.)
 Owens Illinois
 Paisley
 Pyrex
 Sterling
 Seiler’s
 Standard Glass Insulator Company 
 Thomas-Houston Electric Company
 Thames Glass Works
 Twiggs
 Western Electric Manufacturing Company
 Western Glass Manufacturing Company
 Western Flint Glass Company
 Whitall Tatum Company

Canada 
 Diamond
 Dominion
 Hamilton Glass Works
 G.N.W.TEL. Co.

International 
 Agee (Australia)
 Isorex (France)
 Miva (Italy)
 Telgraficos Nacionales (Mexico)
 Zicme (South America)

References

External links 

 National Insulator Association
 U.S. glass insulator reference site
 General Overview on Glass Insulators

Overhead power lines
Electric power distribution
Ceramic engineering